Deschamps Creek is a stream in the U.S. state of Missouri. It is a tributary to Monsanto-Sunswept Creek.

Deschamps Creek was named after A. A. Deschamps, a local educator.

References

Rivers of Missouri
Rivers of St. Louis County, Missouri